Chen Yi-hsiung (died 29 March 2004) was the prime suspect in the 3-19 shooting incident, a failed attempt to assassinate the president of Taiwan Chen Shui-bian, and perhaps vice president Annette Lu, on 19 March 2004, one day prior to the 2004 presidential election. Chen was unemployed and blamed the president for his economic woes.

Finding Chen Yi-hsiung
Working off of clues from a video that was shot near the attack, authorities spent months  tracing the bullets used in the assassination attempt to an illegal gun maker.  After questioning the individual, investigators were able to follow the purchase to Chen Yi-hsiung, who was found drowned in a harbour in Tainan 10 days after the attack.

Controversy
While the case has officially been closed, with the main suspect Chen Yi-hsiung dead, police are having a hard time proving their theory.  While Chen Yi-hsiung's death was officially ruled a suicide, with both suicide notes (supposedly burned by his family) and a video of his wife apologizing for her husband's crime backing up this theory, opponents of president Chen disagree with this conclusion.  President Chen's foes claim that the assassination attempt was planned in order to win sympathy votes, which led to president Chen winning the election by just over 29,500 votes, barely hours after the attempted assassination.

Notes

External links
 Taiwan Assassin 3/19

20th-century births
2004 suicides
2004 crimes in Taiwan
Failed assassins
Taiwanese criminals
Suicides by drowning
Year of birth missing
Suicides in Taiwan
Place of birth missing